Simple Man may refer to:

Music
Simple Man (Klaus Nomi album), 1982
Simple Man (Charlie Daniels album), 1989
"Simple Man" (Charlie Daniels song), 1989
"Simple Man" (Lynyrd Skynyrd song), 1973
Also covered by the Deftones
"Simple Man" (Noiseworks song), 1989
"Simple Man" a song on Bad Company's 1976 album Run with the Pack
"Simple Man" a song by Hardcore Superstar from their self-titled album
"Simple Man", a 2011 song by Mischa Daniels & Sandro Monte feat. J-Son
"Simple Man", a song by Australian hip-hop outfit, Diafrix, featuring Daniel Merriweather, 2012

Other media
"Simple Man" (CSI: Miami), a 2003 episode of CSI: Miami
 A Simple Man (book), a book written by Ronnie Kasrils on South African President Jacob Zuma
 The Measure of a Man (2015 film) (A Simple Man), a French drama film

See also
"I Am a Simple Man", a 1991 song by Ricky Van Shelton